Fred Taylor Sullivan was an American college football coach. He served as the head football coach at Ohio University in 1899 and again in 1903, compiling a record of 4–6. Sullivan was a 1903 graduate of Ohio University.

Head coaching record

References

Year of birth missing
Year of death missing
Ohio Bobcats football coaches
Ohio University alumni
People from Warwick, New York